Mirim station is a freight-only railway station located in P'yŏngyang, North Korea, on the P'yŏngdŏk Line of the Korean State Railway.

History
The station was opened by the Chosen Government Railway on 5 May 1918, as part of the second section of the P'yŏngyang Colliery Line.

Services
The freight-only station at Mirim is responsible for handling freight for the Taedonggang-guyŏk, Taesong-guyŏk and Sadong-guyŏk districts of P'yŏngyang. The main commodities arriving there are anthracite from Namdŏk, Hŭngryŏng and elsewhere, and cement from the Sŭngho-ri Cement Factory at Sŭngho-ri.

References

Railway stations in North Korea